= The Way of War (miniatures rules) =

Miniatures game

The Way of War is a 1998 miniatures game published by The CaBil.

== Gameplay ==
The Way of War is a game in which a universal miniatures system is intended to be used with miniatures of any genre.

== Reception ==
The online second version of Pyramid reviewed The Way of War and commented that "The Way of War has rules for everything, or just about everything. And it manages to get it all covered in the first 75 pages or so of the rulebook."

== Reviews ==
- Backstab #15
